The West Sitting Hall is located on the second floor of the White House, home of the president of the United States. The room is entered from the second floor Center Hall on the east side of the room. The room features a large lunette window on the west wall looks out upon the West Colonnade, the West Wing, and the Old Executive Office Building. The room is used by first families as a less formal living room than the Yellow Oval Room. 

White House architect James Hoban's initial 1793 plan and 1814 reconstruction design both placed a double Imperial stair form here, with a single stair rising from the ground floor at the terminus of the Cross Hall and dividing to two stairs returning double runs to the east in the present space. Hoban's original plan was not built as designed, as Thomas Jefferson engaged Benjamin Henry Latrobe in 1803 to reverse the orientation of the stair. Latrobe's alteration placed a double run on either side rising from the west to a landing on the east and a single run returning west to the second floor.

Alterations in 1869 simplified the stair moving it along the north side of the space and allowing a sitting area to the south. Presidents and first ladies would descend to the Cross Hall below during state dinners and official entertaining. 

The room was mainly just a grand staircase until President Ulysses Grant had it remodeled, allowing for sitting space by the nearby window.

The 1869 staircase was removed during the administration of Theodore Roosevelt as part of a reconfiguration of the White House by architect Charles Follen McKim. McKim's plan removed the west stairway entirely creating room for a much enlarged State Dining Room and moved the ceremonial stair to site of the present Grand Staircase.

Eleanor Roosevelt, who screened the area off from the Central Hall, particularly enjoyed it. In the subsequent Truman reconstruction, architects enclosed the hall with solid partitions and created a living room. At that time, the kitchen elevator was extended to this floor, and the door opened into this room; the Kennedy restoration rerouted it into the little hall when the room to the north was converted into the Family Kitchen. During the Truman reconstruction the east wall was rebuilt to include framed double doors allowing the room more privacy.

See also
 East Sitting Hall

References

Further reading 
 Abbott, James A. A Frenchman in Camelot: The Decoration of the Kennedy White House by Stéphane Boudin. Boscobel Restoration Inc.: 1995. .
 McKellar, Kenneth, Douglas W. Orr, Edward Martin, et al. Report of the Commission on the Renovation of the Executive Mansion. Commission on the Renovation of the Executive Mansion, Government Printing Office: 1952.
 Seale, William. The President's House. White House Historical Association and the National Geographic Society: 1986. .
 Seale, William, The White House: The History of an American Idea. White House Historical Association: 1992, 2001. .
 The White House: An Historic Guide. White House Historical Association and the National Geographic Society: 2001. .

External links

 White House Historical Association: Residence second floor
 White House Museum: West Sitting Hall

Rooms in the White House
Benjamin Henry Latrobe buildings and structures